Anna Petra Sofia Johansson (née Larsson; born 30 September 1988) is a Swedish football midfielder. She previously played for Linköping FC and during the 2012–13 winter season she represented Australian W-League team Melbourne Victory.

Club career
In November 2016 Johansson announced that she was returning to Eskilstuna United after a year of football retirement, during which she changed her surname from Larsson and gave birth to daughter Norah.

International career
Johansson made her senior international debut on 19 August 2009, in Sweden's 1–0 friendly defeat by Norway in Enköping. She was named in national coach Thomas Dennerby's squad for UEFA Women's Euro 2009, as cover for Nilla Fischer who was carrying a heel injury.

After a five-year hiatus, Johansson returned to the national team for a 1–0 UEFA Women's Euro 2017 qualifying win over Denmark in October 2015. The following month she made a shock retirement from football aged 27 years to concentrate on her civilian career. The decision disappointed national coach Pia Sundhage, who was planning to select Johansson for the 2016 UEFA Women's Olympic Qualifying Tournament.

References

External links

Profile  at SvFF

1988 births
Living people
Damallsvenskan players
Linköpings FC players
Eskilstuna United DFF players
Swedish women's footballers
Sweden women's international footballers
Melbourne Victory FC (A-League Women) players
Swedish expatriate women's footballers
Swedish expatriate sportspeople in Australia
Expatriate women's soccer players in Australia
A-League Women players
Women's association football midfielders
People from Borlänge Municipality
Sportspeople from Dalarna County